Jelle Bataille (born 20 May 1999) is a Belgian footballer who plays as a defender for Antwerp.

Club career
He scored his first goal in the Belgian First Division A on the 9 May 2018 at home against Lokeren, on an assist from Robbie D'Haese, a player he grew through the youth ranks of the club with.

On 18 June 2021, he signed a three-year contract with Antwerp.

References

External links

1999 births
Living people
Sportspeople from Tournai
Footballers from Hainaut (province)
Belgian footballers
Belgium youth international footballers
Belgium under-21 international footballers
Association football defenders
K.V. Oostende players
Royal Antwerp F.C. players
Belgian Pro League players